, real name  is a Japanese author of light novels and manga. He has written the series Log Horizon and Maoyū Maō Yūsha, both series have been adapted into anime. He is also the author of a manga series titled .

In 2015, Tōno was charged with tax evasion for reportedly violating the Corporate Tax Law. Reports claim that Tōno: "allegedly failed to file 120 million yen (around US$996,438) in royalties from the printed versions of his MAOYU and Log Horizon novels for his income tax report in a three-year period ending the previous year. According to the prosecutor's office, Touno owes the Japanese government 30 million yen (around US$249,114) in taxes." Some time after, the author apologized to his fans and stated in his official website that he filed and paid back his taxes, concluding the investigation.

References

External links
Official website
"Log Horizon" Author Answers 4Chan Readers' Questions, October 22, 2013

Japanese writers
Light novelists
Manga writers